The Puente Río Portugués is a historic bridge over the former course of the Río Portugués in barrio Playa in the municipality of Ponce, Puerto Rico. The bridge was added to the U.S. National Register of Historic Places in 2015. The bridge is prominent as "the oldest longitudinal steel beams / reinforced concrete bridge built within the historic Carretera Central". It is located on Avenida Hostos, just south of its intersection with Ponce By Pass.

History
On 25 September 1852, the editor of Ponce newspaper El Ponceño suggested a bridge be built where Puente Río Portugués is currently located. In 1856, the Ponce City Hall took on the matter and named a commission to detail the budget needed to build a bridge over Río Portugués. On 25 June 1857, the Puerto Rico Bidding Board opened up the bidding process and, having only one bid, it was given to Juan Bertoli Calderoni for his 12,400 pesos quote. The bridge would be known as Principe de Asturias Bridge or Principe Alfonso Bridge. The bridge opened in 1862. However, in 1864, there were floods that raze and destroyed it.

In 1876, the first non wooden bridge built at the site was brought from France, christened with the name Alfonso XII, and installed that year. This metal bridged was used for 23 years until the river knocked it off as a result of the rising waters from Hurricane San Ciriaco in 1899.

In 1903 a contract was awarded to Carlos Clausells for a wooden submersible bridge over Portugués River.

The French bridge was recovered 15 years later, in 1914, and installed near Yauco, over Yauco's Rio Duey, where it provided service until 1991, and today (2011) in can be seen at the Parque Urbano de Yauco, on highway PR-127 near the  intersection with PR-128.

Thirty-four years after the hurricane, in 1933, the current bridge, Puente Rio Portugues, was inaugurated. A steel plaque identifies the sitting governor and other officials at the time. It was built at a cost of $48,484 ($ in  dollars).

Architecture
The bridge is architecturally Art Deco style and structurally it is built as a longitudinal beam with the exterior made up of reinforced concrete, steel, and cast iron. Rafael Nones of the Puerto Rico Department of the Interior was in charge of its design.

Gallery

See also
 Puente de los Leones
 Puente La Milagrosa
 National Register of Historic Places listings in Ponce, Puerto Rico

References

Further reading
 Abbad y Lasierra, Inigo. Historia geográfica, civil y natural de la Isla de San Juan Bautista de Puerto Rico. Anotada en la parte histórica y continuada en la estadistica y economica por Jose Julian Acosta y Calbo. Ediciones Doce Calles. 2002.
 Archivo General de Puerto Rico. Fondo: Obras Publicas. Serie: Carreteras y Puentes. Caja 2154, Legajo 53N; Caja 2155, Legajo 53"O"; Caja 2156, Legajo 53P; Caja 2157. Legajo 53Q (Construccion Puente Rio Portugues).  
 Archivo General de Puerto Rico. Gobierno de Puerto Rico. Estadística general del comercio exterior o balancas mercantiles, 1895.
 Archivo General de Puerto Rico. Postales de la Colección Jungham.
 Franchises Granted by the extinct Executive Council and the Public Service Commission of Porto Rico. Franchise Ordinance No. 3. Volume 1I. 26 November 1901 to 21 May 1915. San Juan, Puerto Rico. Bureau of Supplies, Printing, and Transportation. 1924.
 Marin, Ramon. La Villa de Ponce considerada en tres distantas épocas: Estudio histórico, descriptivo y estadístico hasta finales del año 1876. Editoriales publicados en el periódico "La Crónica". Establecimiento Tipográfico "El Vapor". Ponce, Puerto Rico. 1877. See, Ramon Marín, Obras Completas. Ponce, Puerto Rico. 1989.
 Pumarada, O'Neill, Luis and Maria de los Angeles Castro. La Carretera Central. Un viaje escénico a la historia de Puerto Rico. Centro de Investigación y Desarrollo. Universidad de Puerto Rico, Reciento de Mayagüez. Oficina Estatal de Preservación Histórica. September 1977.
 Revista de Obras Públicas de Puerto Rico. Year XI. Number 6. June 1934. 
 Tomás de Córdova, Pedro. Memorias geográficas, históricas y estadísticas de la isla de Puerto Rico. Tomo II. Year: 1831. Instituto de Cultura Puertorriqueña. San Juan, Puerto Rico. 1968.
 Ubeda y Delgado, Manuel. Isla de Puerto Rico: Estudio histórico, geográfico y estadístico de la misma. Puerto Rico. Establecimiento Tip. Del Boletin. 1878.

External links
 Summary sheet from the Puerto Rico State Historic Preservation Office 
 , National Register of Historic Places cover documentation

Road bridges on the National Register of Historic Places in Puerto Rico
Bridges completed in 1933
National Register of Historic Places in Ponce, Puerto Rico
Bridges in Ponce, Puerto Rico
1933 establishments in Puerto Rico
Art Deco architecture in Puerto Rico
Concrete bridges